The following are the standings of current National Football League teams' games taking place on their opening days. The standings shown here date back to 1933. Since 1933, there have been a total of 1,579 opening day games played.

Standings are current as of the final day of the 2007 NFL season's opening weekend, September 10, 2007.

Standings

References
2003 National Football League Record and Fact Book 
2003, 2004, 2005, 2006 and  NFL opening weekend results at ESPN.com 
NFL Holland Trivia Topic

See also
National Football League

History of the National Football League